A PUVA keratosis is a precancerous keratotic skin lesion that arises from exposure to psoralen plus ultraviolet A light therapy.

See also 
 PUVA-induced acrobullous dermatosis
 List of cutaneous conditions

References 

Epidermal nevi, neoplasms, and cysts